Osoriomyces is a genus of fungi in the family Laboulbeniaceae. A monotypic genus. it contains the single species Osoriomyces rhizophorus.

References

External links
Osoriomyces at Index Fungorum

Laboulbeniaceae
Monotypic Laboulbeniomycetes genera
Laboulbeniales genera